Suaeda aralocaspica is a species of plant in the family Amaranthaceae that is restricted to the deserts of Central Asia. It is a halophyte and uses  carbon fixation but lacks the characteristic leaf anatomy of other  plants (known as  kranz anatomy). Carrying out complete C4 photosynthesis within individual cells, these plants instead are known as single‐cell C4 system or SCC4 plants. This makes them distinct from typical C4 plants, which require the collaboration of two types of photosynthetic cells. SCC4 plants have features that make them potentially valuable in engineering higher photosynthetic efficiencies in agriculturally important C3 carbon fixation species such as rice. To address this, the 467 Mb genome of S. aralocaspica has been sequenced to help understanding of the evolution of SCC4 photosynthesis and contribute to the engineering of C4 photosynthesis into other economically important crops.

It flowers in August, producing seeds of two different sizes that differ in their morphology, dormancy and germination characteristics.

The species was formerly classified in its own genus Borszczowia, which is now treated as section within genus Suaeda.

References

aralocaspica
Flora of Central Asia
Barilla plants
Taxa named by Alexander von Bunge